Fernando Jorge Fajardo Arias (born June 3, 1975), commonly known as Fernando Fajardo, is a Uruguayan footballer who plays as a right defender for Club Atlético Progreso.

External links
 Profile at soccerway
 Profile at albacete official website
 Profile at bdfutbol

1975 births
Living people
Footballers from Montevideo
Uruguayan footballers
Uruguayan expatriate footballers
Defensor Sporting players
Centro Atlético Fénix players
Club Nacional de Football players
Rampla Juniors players
Peñarol players
Elche CF players
RC Celta de Vigo players
Albacete Balompié players
Uruguayan expatriate sportspeople in Spain
Association football defenders